Marija Ilić (born 3 June 1993) is a Serbian football defender, who plays for MSV Duisburg in the Frauen-Bundesliga.

Club career

Ilić moved to Turkey and joined the newly established  Istanbul clubFatih Karagümrük to play 2021-22 Turkcell Women's Super League.

Honours 
Serbian Super Liga
Spartak Subotica
 Winners (5): 2010-11, 2011–12, 2012–13, 2013–14, 2014–15

Serbian Women's Cup
Spartak Subotica
 Winners (4): 2011–12, 2012–13, 2013–14, 2014–15

References

External links 
 
 UEFA Statistics
 Member of the Serbian national team
 Best Serbian soccer player in 2014

1993 births
Living people
Serbian women's footballers
Serbia women's international footballers
Women's association football defenders
Serbian expatriate sportspeople in Turkey
Expatriate women's footballers in Turkey
Expatriate sportspeople in Germany
ŽFK Spartak Subotica players
BIIK Kazygurt players
Fatih Karagümrük S.K. (women's football) players
Turkish Women's Football Super League players